Denmark has approximately 900 streams with outlet to the sea.

The longest river is Gudenå with  while Skjern Å has the largest discharge at the mouth with on average 30 m3/s.

References 

Denmark
Rivers